Eskil Wedholm (2 March 1891 – 10 December 1959) was a Swedish freestyle swimmer. He competed in two events at the 1912 Summer Olympics.

References

External links
 

1891 births
1959 deaths
Olympic swimmers of Sweden
Swimmers at the 1912 Summer Olympics
People from Eskilstuna
Swedish male freestyle swimmers
Sportspeople from Södermanland County